Sawyer County is a county  in the U.S. state of Wisconsin. As of the 2020 census, the population was 18,074. Its county seat is Hayward. The county partly overlaps with the reservation of the Lac Courte Oreilles Band of Lake Superior Chippewa Indians.

History
The area that is now Sawyer County was contested between the Dakota and Ojibwe people in the eighteenth century. Oral histories tell that the Ojibwes defeated the Dakotas locally in the Battle of the Horse Fly on the Upper Chippewa River in the 1790s. By this time Lac Courte Oreilles had become the site of an Ojibwe village. Ojibwes allowed trader Michel Cadotte to build a fur trade outpost in the area in 1800. The United States acquired the region from the Ojibwe nation in the 1837 Treaty of St. Peters, but the Ojibwes retained the right to hunt and fish on treaty territory. Ojibwe people successfully negotiated to establish the permanent Lac Courte Oreilles Indian Reservation in the 1854 Treaty of La Pointe.

The county is named for Philetus Sawyer, a New England man who represented Wisconsin in the U.S. House of Representatives and U.S. Senate in the 19th century.  Logging began in the late 1850s. Loggers came from Cortland County, New York, Carroll County, New Hampshire, Orange County, Vermont and Down East Maine in what is now Washington County, Maine and Hancock County, Maine.  These were "Yankee" migrants, that is to say they were descended from the English Puritans who had settled New England during the 1600s.  They were mostly members of the Congregational Church. Sawyer County was created in 1883 and organized in 1885. In the 1890s immigrants came from a variety of countries such as Germany, Norway, Poland, Ireland and Sweden.

Geography
It is the fifth-largest county in Wisconsin by land area.

Major highways

  U.S. Highway 63
  Highway 27 (Wisconsin)
  Highway 40 (Wisconsin)
  Highway 48 (Wisconsin)
  Highway 70 (Wisconsin)
  Highway 77 (Wisconsin)
 Sawyer County Highway B is the busiest rural roadway on average in all of Sawyer County with a high count of 5900 vehicles daily, according to the Wisconsin Department of Transportation's average daily traffic maps for 2008. https://web.archive.org/web/20100602030241/http://www.dot.wisconsin.gov/travel/counts/docs/sawyer/sawyer2008.pdf

Railroads
Canadian National
Wisconsin Great Northern Railroad

Buses
List of intercity bus stops in Wisconsin

Airport
Sawyer County Airport (KHYR) serves the county and surrounding communities.

Adjacent counties
 Bayfield County - north
 Ashland County - northeast
 Price County - east
 Rusk County - south
 Barron County - southwest
 Washburn County - west
 Douglas County - northwest

National protected areas
 Chequamegon National Forest (part)
 Saint Croix National Scenic Riverway (part)

Demographics

2020 census
As of the census of 2020, the population was 18,074. The racial makeup of the county was 77.0% White, 16.3% Native American, 0.6% Black or African American, 0.3% Asian, 0.6% from other races, and 5.2% from two or more races. Ethnically, the population was 2.0% Hispanic or Latino of any race.

2000 census

As of the census of 2000, there were 16,196 people, 6,640 households, and 4,581 families residing in the county.  The population density was 13 people per square mile (5/km2). There were 13,722 housing units at an average density of 11 per square mile (4/km2). The racial makeup of the county was 81.72% White, 0.31% Black or African American, 16.07% Native American, 0.30% Asian, 0.02% Pacific Islander, 0.35% from other races, and 1.23% from two or more races.  0.90% of the population were Hispanic or Latino of any race. 29.6% were of German, 7.8% Irish, 6.7% Norwegian, 5.9% Polish, 5.2% Swedish and 5.2% English ancestry. 95.4% spoke English, 2.0% Ojibwa and 1.1% Spanish as their first language.

There were 6,640 households, out of which 27.50% had children under the age of 18 living with them, 54.20% were married couples living together, 10.00% had a female householder with no husband present, and 31.00% were non-families. 26.20% of all households were made up of individuals, and 11.70% had someone living alone who was 65 years of age or older. The average household size was 2.39 and the average family size was 2.86.

In the county, the population was spread out, with 24.10% under the age of 18, 6.00% from 18 to 24, 24.60% from 25 to 44, 27.40% from 45 to 64, and 17.90% who were 65 years of age or older. The median age was 42 years. For every 100 females there were 101.80 males. For every 100 females age 18 and over, there were 101.00 males.

In 2017, there were 167 births, giving a general fertility rate of 74.5 births per 1000 women aged 15–44, the 8th highest rate out of all 72 Wisconsin counties. Additionally, there were fewer than five reported induced abortions performed on women of Sawyer County residence in 2017.

Communities

City
 Hayward (county seat)

Villages
 Couderay
 Exeland
 Radisson
 Winter

Towns

 Bass Lake
 Couderay
 Draper
 Edgewater
 Hayward
 Hunter
 Lenroot
 Meadowbrook
 Meteor
 Ojibwa
 Radisson
 Round Lake
 Sand Lake
 Spider Lake
 Weirgor
 Winter

Census-designated places
 Chief Lake
 Little Round Lake
 New Post
 Reserve
 Stone Lake (partial)

Unincorporated communities

 Draper
 Edgewater
 Hauer
 Hay Stack Corner
 Lemington
 Loretta
 Meteor
 Northwoods Beach
 Ojibwa
 Oxbo
 Phipps
 Seeley
 Weirgor
 Wooddale
 Yarnell

Politics
Sawyer County has a historical reputation for being a bellwether county in presidential elections, having voted for the overall national winner in every election from 1964 to 2016. This streak was broken in 2020 when the county backed Donald Trump, who lost to Joe Biden. This is similar to numerous other bellwether counties .  This is because of the greater geographic polarization in American politics, with fewer and fewer counties swinging between parties but instead consistently voting for one party according to demographics.

See also
 National Register of Historic Places listings in Sawyer County, Wisconsin

References

Further reading
 Clark, W. N. and M. H. Clark. A Short History of Southern Sawyer County. Eau Claire, Wis.: Wisconsin Colonization Co., 1920.

External links

 Sawyer County government website
 Sawyer County map from the Wisconsin Department of Transportation

 
1885 establishments in Wisconsin
Populated places established in 1885